"Seven" is the fourth single from Swedish recording artist Fever Ray's self-titled debut album, Fever Ray (2009).

Music video
The music video for "Seven" features Kari Sylwan lip-synching to the song.

Track listing
iTunes single
"Seven" (Edit) – 3:43
"Seven" (CSS Remix) – 5:07
"Seven" (Martyn's Seventh Mix) – 4:36
"Seven" (Crookers Remix) – 3:56
"Seven" (Marcel Dettmann's Voice In My Head) – 5:42
"Seven" (Nic Chacona Strobelight Mix) – 6:52
"Seven" (Seth Troxler Remix) – 7:10

UK 12" single
A1. "Seven" (Crookers Remix) – 3:57
A2. "Seven" (Marcel Dettmann's Voice in My Head) – 5:43
B1. "Seven" (Martyn's Seventh Mix) – 4:37
B2. "Seven" (CSS Remix) – 5:07

UK promo CD single
"Seven" (Radio Edit) – 3:45
"Seven" (CSS Remix) – 5:09
"Seven" (Martyn Remix) – 4:39
"Seven" (Crookers Remix) – 3:58
"Seven" (Marcel Dettman Remix) – 7:10
"Seven" (Nicholas Chacona Remix) – 6:54
"Seven" (Seth Troxler Remix) – 7:12
"Seven" (Marcel Dettman Whispering Voices Remix) – 5:43

Charts

References

2009 singles
2009 songs
Fever Ray songs
Songs written by Karin Dreijer